Chennur Assembly Constituency is a constituency of  Telangana Legislative Assembly, India. Initially it was two member Constituency till 1962, later it was Created as Single Member Constituency in the year 1962. It is one of three constituencies in Mancherial district. Chennur is located in south of the Mancherial district. It comes under Peddapally Lok Sabha constituency.

Balka Suman of Telangana Rashtra Samithi is representing the constituency for the first time.

Mandals
The Assembly Constituency presently comprises the following Mandals:

Members of the Legislative Assembly 
Members of Legislative Assembly who represented Chennur

Election results

Telangana Legislative Assembly election, 2018

Telangana Legislative Assembly election, 2014

Andhra Pradesh Legislative Assembly election, 2009

See also
 List of constituencies of Telangana Legislative Assembly

References

External links
 Chennur Constituency Website

Assembly constituencies of Telangana
Mancherial district